The Bayer designation Delta Canis Minoris (δ CMi / δ Canis Minoris) is shared by three stars in the constellation Canis Minor:
 δ1 Canis Minoris
 δ2 Canis Minoris
 δ3 Canis Minoris

Canis Minoris, Delta
Canis Minor